Mims or MIMS may refer to:

Acronyms
 Mandarin Immersion Magnet School, Houston, Texas
 MediCiti Institute of Medical Sciences, a medical college near Hyderabad, India 
 Membrane-introduction mass spectrometry
 Monthly Index of Medical Specialities, a guide to pharmaceuticals for health practitioners
 Municipal Infrastructure Management System, used in Canada
 Manchester Institute for Mathematical Sciences, School of Mathematics, University of Manchester

People
Mims (rapper) (born 1981), American rapper
Mims Davies (born 1975), British politician
D. Jeffrey Mims, American artist
Denzel Mims (born 1997), American football wide receiver
Edwin Mims (1872–1959), American professor of English literature
Forrest Mims, American amateur scientist and author
Mario Mims, American rapper, songwriter, and record executive known professionally as Yo Gotti
Marvin Mims (born 2002), American football player
Matthew Mims, American professional wrestler
Sam Mims Jr. (1880-1946), Mississippi state senator
Sam Mims V (born 1972), member of the Mississippi House of Representatives and great-grandson of the above

Other uses
 Mims, Florida, United States, a census-designated place

See also
 Mimms (disambiguation)